{{DISPLAYTITLE:C18H16O8}}
The molecular formula C18H16O8 (molar mass : 360.31 g/mol, exact mass : 360.084517 u) may refer to:

 Arcapillin, a flavone
 Centaureidin, a flavonol
 Irigenin, an isoflavone
 Jaceidin, a flavonol
 Rosmarinic acid, a hydroxycinnamic acid ester

Molecular formulas